M152 may refer to:

M-152 (Michigan highway), a state highway
Mercedes-Benz M152 engine, an automobile engine
M152, a variant of the Dodge M37 military vehicle
 M152 (Cape Town), a Metropolitan Route in Cape Town, South Africa